Patrick O'Neal Jefferson (born November 18, 1968) is a Democratic member of the Louisiana House of Representatives for the 11th district, which includes Bienville, Claiborne, and Lincoln parishes. Jefferson is an attorney in private practice in Arcadia, Louisiana.

Jefferson graduated in 1990 from the historically black Dillard University in New Orleans.

Opposition to Marriage and Conscience Act

Jefferson ran unopposed for reelection to the House in the October 24, 2015, primary election.

References

External links
 
Legislative page

1968 births
Living people
Democratic Party members of the Louisiana House of Representatives
Parish jurors and commissioners in Louisiana
People from Arcadia, Louisiana
Dillard University alumni
Ohio State University Moritz College of Law alumni
African-American state legislators in Louisiana
21st-century American politicians
21st-century African-American politicians
20th-century African-American people